The Georgian Badminton Federation (GBF) is the governing body for badminton in Georgia. It aims to govern, encourage and develop the sport for all throughout the country.

History
The GBF was established on 19 July 1991. Its first president was Pavle Nonikashvili. In 1992 The GBF was accepted by International Badminton Federation as the  member. Continentally, it is a member of the Badminton Europe confederation.

Presidents of Georgian Badminton Federation

See also
 Georgian National Badminton Championships

External links
 Georgian Badminton Federation official site (Georgian)

National members of the Badminton World Federation
Federation
Badminton
Sports organizations established in 1991
1991 establishments in Georgia (country)